Mater and the Ghostlight is a 2006 American computer-animated short film released as a special feature on the DVD of Pixar's film Cars, which was released in the United States on November 7, 2006. The short, set in the Cars world, tells a story of Mater being haunted by a mysterious blue light.

Plot
The short opens with Mater pranking the other residents of Radiator Springs by moving Red's flowers, bursting out from a pile of tires (built to resemble the Colosseum) to startle Guido and Luigi, dressing up as a cone vampire to scare Sally, attempting to scare Lizzie while she is sleeping (which is unsuccessful), moving Fillmore's gas cans back outside while he takes them in and finally scaring Lightning McQueen when he believes Mater is hiding behind a pile of cans ready to jump out (what was really behind the pile of cans was one of Mater's signs). This sequence then culminates with Mater teasing McQueen as if he had seen "the Ghostlight," a Route 66 urban legend.

Sheriff admonishes him for mocking the urban legend. When McQueen asks about the Ghostlight, Sheriff explains that the Ghostlight is a blue paranormal orb of light that haunts Radiator Springs, but Mater reminds Lightning that it is not real. Sheriff points out that it is real, shocking them. He then tells everyone the tale of the Ghostlight, explaining the disappearance of a young couple that encountered it, leaving behind two "out-of-state license plates" and that it hates nothing more than the sound of clanking metal. At this point, Mater is so scared that he begins making the noise that the Ghostlight dislikes the most and tries to stop himself. Sheriff ends the story with a warning that the Ghostlight could be anywhere. The rest of the residents say goodnight and turn off all the store lights, leaving a nervous and scared Mater all alone in the dark. Nervous, he returns to his junkyard and sees a shadow of a monster and, in a sudden shock, shines his light on it, revealing it to be just a pile of junk with another of his signs. After he accidentally breaks his headlight in fear, he enters his wall-less garage and closes the door, which then falls down. A light suddenly appears in front of him and he panics, believing it to be the Ghostlight until he realizes it is just a lightning bug. Suddenly, a blue light appears behind him. After using his mirror to observe it, he runs for it thinking it is that Ghostlight.

For the remainder of the short, mayhem ensues as Mater is pursued by the Ghostlight, ultimately revealed to be just a lantern affixed to Mater's towing cable by Lightning and Guido. He wakes Frank and his tractors and drives through Willy’s Butte and goes into slow motion (in a matter similar to Doc Hudson’s slide in Cars). The other residents of Radiator Springs watch as Mater drives around frantically with the "Ghostlight" on his tail, before Mater tires himself out and discovers the truth. The cars tell him it was all a prank to pay him back for all his pranks he played on them. Sheriff gently tells Mater that the only thing to be scared of on Route 66 is "his imagination." Doc jokingly adds that all Mater really had to fear was "the Screaming Banshee" before they all leave Mater, alone and frightened once again.

In a post-credits scene, Mater actually encounters the Screaming Banshee (which is actually an enormous truck who is both a monster truck and a construction vehicle with a broken windshield and a "BANSHEE" logo on the front) on the road, but unaware it is him, warns him of the Banshee before departing for the safety of his junkyard once again, leaving the monstrous vehicle confused.

Cast
 Larry the Cable Guy as Mater
 Owen Wilson as Lightning McQueen
 Bonnie Hunt as Sally Carrera
 Paul Newman as Doc Hudson
 Michael Wallis as Sheriff
 Cheech Marin as Ramone
 Paul Dooley as Sarge
Non-speaking characters appearing in the film include Luigi, Guido, Flo, Fillmore, Lizzie, Mack, Frank and Red.

Release
Mater and the Ghostlight premiered on November 7, 2006, on the Cars DVD release as a special feature. On November 6, 2007, it got its first Blu-ray releases, once again attached as a special to Cars and as part of Pixar Short Films Collection, Volume 1.

References

External links 

  at Pixar
  at Disney
 
 

2006 short films
2000s American animated films
2000s animated short films
2006 black comedy films
American black comedy films
American animated short films
Cars (franchise)
Films based on urban legends
Short films directed by John Lasseter
Films set in Arizona
Pixar short films
Films with screenplays by John Lasseter
Films with screenplays by Joe Ranft
2006 comedy films
2000s English-language films
American short films
Films about trucks